Farr Hollow (also known as Farr Hollow Run) is a tributary of North Branch Mehoopany Creek in Wyoming County, Pennsylvania, in the United States. The stream is not designated as an impaired waterbody and flows through a mixture of forested and agricultural land. Eleven different fish species have been observed in the stream, including brook trout.

Course
Farr Hollow begins in a pond near Farr Hollow Road in Windham Township. It flows southeast and then south for a few tenths of a mile before entering North Branch Township. Here, the stream flows south-southeast through a progressively narrowing valley between Douglas Hill and Cedar Hill. After a few miles, it reaches its confluence with North Branch Mehoopany Creek.

Hydrology
Farr Hollow is not designated as an impaired waterbody.

In 2001, measurements of pH near the source and mouth of Farr Hollow were 7.4 and 7.0, respectively. The total water hardness of the stream was  near the source and  near the mouth, while the specific conductance at these locations was 266 and 135 umhos, respectively.

Geography and geology

Farr Hollow is a moderate-gradient stream whose source is in an unnamed pond. The stream flows in a generally southeasterly direction.

Watershed
The stream is entirely within the United States Geological Survey quadrangle of Jenningsville. It joins North Branch Mehoopany Creek at Forkston. The stream's designated use is for aquatic life.

The land in the vicinity of Farr Hollow includes a mixture of both forested and agricultural land. A total of 36 percent of the stream's length is within  of a road, while 57 percent is within  of one, and 85 percent is within . In 2000, the human population density of the stream's watershed was 5 people per square kilometer (13 per square mile), giving it the second-highest population density of any tributary watershed of North Branch Mehoopany Creek.

History
The valley of Farr Hollow was entered into the Geographic Names Information System on August 2, 1979. Its identifier in the Geographic Names Information System is 1174631. The stream Farr Hollow does not have an official name of its own and instead takes the name of the valley through which it flows. It is also known as Farr Hollow Run.

In the late 19th century, one of the five schools in what was then Forkston Township was located in Farr Hollow. A telephone line was constructed between Farr Hollow and Jenningsville in 1905.

Pennsylvania Fish and Boat Commission biologists performed a fish sampling and other studies on the streams in the North Branch Mehoopany Creek watershed, including Farr Hollow, in 2001. In 2016, the Mehoopany Creek Watershed Association requested that the Pennsylvania Department of Environmental Protection undertake an evaluation of Farr Hollow, along with North Branch Mehoopany Creek and Little Mehoopany Creek.

Biology
Wild trout naturally reproduce in Farr Hollow from its headwaters downstream to its mouth. The stream is classified as a Coldwater Fishery. However, in 2001, these wild brook trout populations were noted to be sparse.

In the 2001 study by the Pennsylvania Fish and Boat Commission, a total of 11 fish species were observed by electrofishing in the lower reaches of Farr Hollow. The low trout populations were primarily due to difficulty for fish to physically access the stream.

Other fish species observed in Farr Hollow in the 2001 study include central stonerollers, common shiners and golden shiners, blacknose dace and longnose dace, creek chub, white sucker, brown bullhead, pumpkinseed, and sculpins.

See also
Douglas Hollow, next tributary of North Branch Mehoopany Creek going upstream
List of rivers of Pennsylvania

References

Tributaries of North Branch Mehoopany Creek